The Keystone, also known as Keystone Berkeley, was a small music club at 2119 University Avenue in Berkeley, California, which operated in the 1970s and 1980s. Numerous nationally known groups performed there, including Tom Petty and the Heartbreakers, Ray Charles, Talking Heads, The Ramones, Metallica and B.B King, Blondie, and Greg Kihn among many others and the club was a regular venue for the Jerry Garcia Band. Keystone Berkeley, run by Freddie Herrera and Bobby Corona, was linked to The Stone and Keystone Palo Alto.

Berkeley
Keystone Korner's Freddie Herrera opened Keystone Berkeley, a larger venue, then sold the Keystone Korner to Todd Barkan The Keystone Berkeley closed in 1984.

Keystone Palo Alto 
Keystone Palo Alto, at 260 California Avenue, opened 20 January 1977. The Keystone Palo Alto closed in 1986. The club became the Vortex in the mid-1980s, then The Edge in 1989, and closed in April 2000. It was remade into a restaurant, finally as Illusions, a restaurant and nightclub. The building was at various times during the last 50 years, a Purity Market, a Natural food store, a German restaurant, called the Zinzanatti Oom Pah Pah Lounge, a club called Sophies, it then was demolished in October 2013.

The Stone
Marty Balin's Matrix at 3138 Fillmore Street closed in early 1971. Peter Abram, along with John Barsotti and Dave Martin, re-opened the club at 412 Broadway (previously Mr D's) in late summer 1973 but it was unsuccessful, only lasting three months. The New York Dolls played September 4–6. Bob Marley and The Wailers played October 29–30. Legend has it that on Halloween of 1973, Iggy and The Stooges, The Tubes and Sugardaddy played a wild show here, but this show seems to have actually taken place in January 1974 at another venue.

Albums recorded at Keystone
Live at Keystone
Keystone Encores
Keystone Companions: The Complete 1973 Fantasy Recordings
Let It Rock: The Jerry Garcia Collection, Vol. 2
''Garcia Live Volume 5
Kill 'Em All (Deluxe Edition 2016)

References

Music venues in the San Francisco Bay Area
Culture of Berkeley, California
Buildings and structures in Berkeley, California
Grateful Dead
Former music venues in California